The Vorwata gas field is a natural gas field located in the South China Sea. It was discovered in 1997 and developed by and Pertamina. It began production in 1997 and produces natural gas and condensates. The total proven reserves of the Vorwata gas field are around 13 trillion cubic feet (371×109m³), and production is slated to be around 95 million cubic feet/day (2.7×105m³).

References

Natural gas fields in Indonesia